The Cane as a Weapon is a book by Andrew Chase Cunningham presenting a concise system of self defense making use of a walking stick or umbrella. It was first published in 1912 in the United States.

Cunningham was a civil engineer attached to the United States Navy throughout the latter years of the 19th century and the early decades of the 20th century. A participant in the sport of fencing, he was the president of the Washington, D.C. Fencing Organization and in 1906 he wrote a Naval drill manual entitled Sabre and Bayonet. In April 1912, Cunningham directed a large fencing tournament, featuring competitors from throughout New York City, Boston and Washington, D.C. The first prize was a magnificent trophy called "The Fighting Gaul" which had been donated by the French Ambassador, Jules Jusserand.

The Cane as a Weapon, Cunningham’s second book, consisted of eighteen pages of text and twelve photographs. It is thought to be the only self-defense manual of its type to be produced in the United States during this period.

Although several European authors had previously produced books and articles on the subject of self-defense with a walking cane, the Cunningham cane defense system was unique in several respects.

Of the three basic guard positions that he advocates, two involve holding the cane with the tip pointed towards the ground. These positions have the advantage of appearing to be non-threatening and also make it difficult for an opponent to seize the defender’s weapon, unlike the more orthodox, fencing-based guards advocated by some other writers. They also serve as positions of invitation, exposing the defender’s head and torso to attack while providing the opportunity to counter such attacks with powerful, upward-sweeping parries.

The third basic guard position, which Cunningham refers to as the double-handed guard, was also featured in several previous works on cane defense. However, his system places an unusual emphasis upon this type of guard, stressing the augmented strength of attacks and defenses and the possibility of quick, snapping attacks and parries to be executed with either hand. Cunningham's advocacy of this position might have been due to his previous experience at bayonet fencing. The double-handed guard also facilitates powerful close-range jabs and "bar strikes" with the portion of the cane held between the defender’s hands.

The author pays special attention to the various different types of counter-attacks, defining the action of performing a cut or strike according to the direction, height, target and "character" of the action.  The latter are defined as snap, half-arm, full-arm or swinging cuts.  He also distinguishes between two types of "stabbing" blow with the cane, the jab and the thrust.

The Cunningham system is ambidextrous and the cane is frequently passed from hand to hand during the defensive sequences that are described and illustrated in the book. Defenses are generally in the form of counter-attacks to the assailant's weapon or to the weapon-wielding hand and targets for counter-attack include the head, throat, midsection, hands, elbows, knees and shins.  Instructions are offered for self-defense against multiple opponents, grappling and boxing attacks as well as against attackers armed with knives and sticks.

The book also includes a series of thirty-seven written descriptions of defensive exercises.

In 2006, an expanded edition was published through lulu.com.

See also
 Bartitsu, a British (and Asian-influenced) approach to use of canes and walking sticks as weapons

References 
A.C. Cunningham. The Cane as a Weapon. Washington, D.C.: National Capital Press, 1912.

American non-fiction books
1912 non-fiction books
North American martial arts
Stick-fighting
Martial arts manuals